The Wayaobu Manifesto was issued in December 1935, by Mao Zedong in Wayaobu, northern Shaanxi. It deliberated on policies and strategies to confront the Japanese invasion of China (see Second Sino-Japanese War).

Mao Zedong called for a national united front with the Kuomintang to resist the Japanese. This appeal struck a responsive chord among Chinese. This decision of the Chinese Communist Party differed sharply with  Chiang Kai-shek's policy of first defeating the Communists before challenging Japan directly (安内攘外).

On December 9, 1935, students and other citizens (dubbed the “December Niners”) held a demonstration on the Tiananmen Square in Beijing (renamed as Beiping then) to protest Chiang Kai-shek's continued “nonresistance” against the Japanese. City police used violence to suppress the students, turning the fire hoses on them, in the near-freezing weather. However, this demonstration became a potent symbol of anti-Japanese resistance and led to patriotic groups sprouting around the country.

See also
 Xi'an Incident
 Long March

References

1935 in China
1935 documents
Assemblies of the Chinese Communist Party